The Flanders Tomorrow Tour is a multi-day road bicycle race held annually in West Flanders, Belgium. In 2021, it was added to the UCI Europe Tour calendar as a category 2.2U event, so is reserved for under-23 riders.

The race consists of four stages over three days, including an individual time trial. The route crosses the province of West Flanders and is mostly flat with short climbs.

Winners

References

External links

Recurring sporting events established in 2021
2021 establishments in Belgium
UCI Europe Tour races
Cycle races in Belgium